The University of Tennessee Medical Center (UTMC) is an academic medical center located in Knoxville, Tennessee and serves as a referral center for East Tennessee and regions in Kentucky and North Carolina. The University of Tennessee Graduate School of Medicine (UTGSM) oversees residency and medical student education at UTMC. In addition to being a Level I Trauma Center, UTMC is recognized as a center for primary stroke, biomedical imaging, adult & children transplantation, pediatric dialysis, and kidney failure. In 2010, UTMC opened Eastern Tennessee's first dedicated heart hospital.

History
UTMC first opened its doors on August 7, 1956, as the University of Tennessee Memorial Hospital. By the 1960s, the hospital acquired more facilities for research, patient care, and residency training. In 1971 the UT Board of Trustees allowed 20 senior medical students from the University of Tennessee College of Medicine to train at UTMC. The hospital saw technological advancements in the 1980s with construction of the Boling Pavilion, the implementation of the area's first emergency response helicopter (Lifestar), and other specialty advancements. In 1991, the UT Board of Trustees assigned the hospital's primary roles of patient care and medical education to University Memorial Hospital and the UT Graduate School of Medicine, respectively. The facility is currently under expansion, with plans to add nearly 50 beds to the Heart Hospital.

Facilities
The 710-bed University of Tennessee Medical Center comprises several medical units: 
Centers of Excellence:
Advanced Orthopaedic Center
Brain and Spine Institute
Cancer Institute
Center for Women & Infants
Emergency and Trauma Center
Heart Lung Vascular Institute
Intensive Care Units
2 Trauma/Surgical ICUs
1 Medical ICU
1 Neuro ICU
1 Cardiovascular ICU
Boling Tower
Preston Medical Library

UT Graduate School of Medicine
The UT Graduate School of Medicine (UTGSM) oversees graduate medical education and medical students. 200 resident physicians, dentists, and fellows engage in the 12 residency and 11 fellowship programs at UTMC. Additionally, UTGSM provides clinical clerkship rotations and electives at UTMC for third and fourth year medical students of UT College of Medicine in Memphis. UTGSM features a Medical Simulation Center where physicians and students increase their medical skills.

See also
University of Tennessee
University of Tennessee College of Medicine

References

External links
UT Medical Center
UT Graduate School of Medicine

University of Tennessee campus
Hospital buildings completed in 1956
Hospitals in Tennessee
University of Tennessee
Teaching hospitals in Tennessee
1956 establishments in Tennessee
Trauma centers